Alonzo Lewis (1794–1861) was a teacher, writer, surveyor, poet, reporter, editor, and publisher of Lynn, Massachusetts.  He was an ardent abolitionist and edited the Lynn Weekly Mirror, the Lynn Record (in 1830), and Freedom's Amulet. He created the 1829 Map of Lynn on order of the Lynn selectmen and Massachusetts Legislature. In 1838, he created a survey of Lynn Beach and Harbor for the US Congress.

He was born August 28, 1794, son of Zachariah and Mary (Hudson) Lewis, and grandson of Nathan and Mary (Newhall) Lewis. His siblings were Irene (born June 10, 1797), Mary (born October 18, 1802), and Henry (born November 3, 1807).

Alonzo married Frances Maria Swan on January 7, 1822. They had six children: Alonzo (born November 30, 1822); Frances Maria (born October 17, 1824); Aurelius (born March 12, 1827); Lewellyn (born April 29, 1829); Arthur Lynnworth (born September 2, 1831); and Thomas (died January 26, 1839). Frances died May 27, 1839, at age 36.
  
He published three books of poetry between 1824 and 1834, and his collected poems were published posthumously in 1883.

He wrote and published The Picture of Nahant, printed by J. B. Tolman in  1845. He also wrote and published A Guide through Nahant with an account of its earliest inhabitants printed in 1851.

His History of Lynn was first published in 1829, printed by J. H. Eastburn in Boston with 260 pages. The second updated version was published in 1844, printed by Samuel N. Dickinson with 276 pages. This 1844 book identifies him as "The Lynn Bard."  James R. Newhall created an updated version in 1865, published by John L. Shorey with 620 pages. This was republished in 1890 by George C. Herbert.

Lewis was the subject of a portrait bust by Joanna Quiner.

References
Poetry of Places in Essex County.  This website has Alonzo Lewis's nicely formatted poem High Rock.
Lewis, Ion editor. The Poetical Works of Alonzo Lewis (Boston: A. Williams & Co.) 1883.
Lewis, Alonzo.  Poems. Published 1831 by J.H. Easturn, 208 pages.
Lewis, Alonzo and James Robinson Newhall.  History of Lynn, Essex County, Massachusetts: Including Lynnfield, Saugus, Swampscott and Nahant. Published 1865 by John L. Shorey 13 Washington St. Lynn. Full copy at books.google. See page 181 for Alonzo's corrected ancestry.
Lewis, George Harlan.  Edmund Lewis of Lynn, Mass. and Some of His Descendants  Published 1908 by the Essex Institute. Full image online at books.google. While mentioned as a source in this book, Alonzo in not recorded as a descendant of Edmund.
Lewis, Alonzo. 1829 Map of Lynn.
Essex Institute. Vital Record of Lynn, Massachusetts. Published in 1905 and 1906. Transcribed and put online by John Slaughter and Jodi Salerno.
Arrington, Benjamin F. History of Essex County, Massachusetts Vol.2 Page 745 Lynn Newspapers. Published 1922.
Kettell, Samuel editor. Specimens of American Poetry Page 332 Death Song by Alonzo Lewis. Volume 2 published 1829.
Cheever, George B. The American Common-place Book of Poetry: With Occasional Notes Page 383 Wanderer of Africa by Alonzo Lewis.  Published by Carter, Hendee, and Babcock 1831.

External links
 

1794 births
1861 deaths
American male poets
People from Lynn, Massachusetts
19th-century American poets
19th-century American male writers
Poets from Massachusetts
American abolitionists
Activists from Massachusetts
19th-century American newspaper editors
American male journalists
Journalists from Massachusetts